Baskin may refer to:

Film
 Baskin (film), a 2015 Turkish surreal horror film by director Can Evrenol

People
Bibi Baskin (born 1952), Irish radio & TV presenter, hotelier, and author
Burt Baskin (1913–1967), American founder of an ice cream chain
Carole Baskin (born 1961), American zookeeper and animal rights activist
David Baskin, American neurosurgeon
Eino Baskin (1929–2015), Estonian actor and theatre director
Elya Baskin (born 1951), Latvian actor
Jeremy Baskin (born 1962), South African labour market analyst
John Baskin, American television writer and producer
Joseph Baskin (1880–1952), Belorussian-born labor activist
Gershon Baskin (born 1956), Israeli peace activist
Leonard Baskin (1922–2000), American sculptor and artist
Monica Baskin, American psychologist
Nora Raleigh Baskin (born 1961), American author
R. N. Baskin (1837–1918), American politician
Roman Baskin (1954–2018), Estonian actor and director
Theodore Baskin (born 1950), American musician  
Kathleen Baskin-Ball (1958–2008), American Methodist minister

Places
Baskin, Louisiana, United States, a village

See also
Baskin-Robbins
Jack Baskin School of Engineering, University of California, Santa Cruz

Jewish surnames